Maarten Diederik Kloosterman (born 27 August 1942) is a retired Dutch rower who won a bronze medal in the coxless fours at the 1966 World Rowing Championships. He competed at the 1968 Summer Olympics in the coxed eights event and finished in eights place.

References

1942 births
Living people
Dutch male rowers
Olympic rowers of the Netherlands
Rowers at the 1968 Summer Olympics
Sportspeople from Utrecht (city)
World Rowing Championships medalists for the Netherlands
20th-century Dutch people
21st-century Dutch people